Raymond John Skelly (July 1, 1941 – July 14, 2019) was a Canadian politician.

A teacher by profession, Skelly was first elected as the New Democratic Party Member of Parliament for Comox—Powell River in the 1979 federal election. He served for fourteen years until being defeated in the 1993 federal election in the renamed riding of North Island--Powell River. This defeat was partly in response to the electorate's dissatisfaction with the provincial government led by New Democratic Party Premier Mike Harcourt. As a result, 15 of 17 incumbent New Democratic Party parliamentarians failed in their re-election bids in 1993.

During his time in Parliament, Ray served as critic on a number of portfolios of particular concern to his constituents including Western economic development, fisheries, and mines & energy. He attempted a comeback in the 2000 federal election in Cariboo—Chilcotin but was defeated. He is the brother of fellow politician Bob Skelly. In the 1988 election, Ray and Bob pulled off a rare feat with both elected to the 34th Parliament and are currently the last siblings to have had the privilege to serve in Parliament together.

References

Sources
 

1941 births
2019 deaths
Members of the House of Commons of Canada from British Columbia
New Democratic Party MPs